George Long (4 November 1800 – 10 August 1879) was an English classical scholar.

Life
Long was born at Poulton-le-Fylde, Lancashire, the son of James Long, West India merchant. He was educated at Macclesfield Grammar School, St John's College, Cambridge and later Trinity College, Cambridge.

He was Craven university scholar in 1821 (bracketed with Lord Macaulay and Henry Maiden), wrangler and senior chancellor's medallist in 1822 and became a fellow of Trinity in 1823. In 1824 he was elected professor of ancient languages in the new University of Virginia at Charlottesville, but after four years returned to England as the first professor of Greek at the newly founded University College in London. Long owned a slave named Jacob while he was at the University.

In 1842 he succeeded T. H. Key as Professor of Latin at University College; in 1846–1849 he was reader in jurisprudence and civil law in the Middle Temple, and finally (1849–1871) classical lecturer at Brighton College. Subsequently, he lived in retirement at Portfield, Chichester, in receipt (from 1873) of a Civil List pension of £100 a year obtained for him by Gladstone.

He was one of the founders (1830), and for twenty years an officer, of the Royal Geographical Society; an active member of the Society for the Diffusion of Useful Knowledge, for which he edited the quarterly Journal of Education (1831–1835) as well as many of its text-books; the editor (at first with Charles Knight, afterwards alone) of the Penny Cyclopaedia and of Knight's Political Dictionary; and a member of the Society for Central Education instituted in London in 1837.

He contributed the Roman law articles to Smith's Dictionary of Greek and Roman Antiquities, and wrote also for the companion dictionaries of Biography and Geography. He is remembered, however, mainly as the editor of the Bibliotheca Classica series—the first serious attempt to produce scholarly editions of classical texts with English commentaries—to which he contributed the edition of Cicero's orations (1851–1862).

Works
Among his other works are:
Summary of Herodotus (1829)
edition of Herodotus (1830–1833)
edition Xenophon's Anabasis (1831)
revised editions of Rev Arthur Macleane's Juvenal and Persius (1867) and Horace (1869)
the Civil Wars of Rome
a translation with Aubrey Stewart and notes of thirteen of Plutarch's Lives (1844–1848)
translation of the Meditations of Marcus Aurelius (1862)
translation of the Discourses of Epictetus (1877)
Decline of the Roman Republic (1864–1874), 5 vols
See HJ Matthews, in Memoriam, reprinted from the Brighton College Magazine, 1879.

Family 
During his time in Virginia, Long married Harriet Selden (nee Gray), the widow of Lieutenant-Colonel Joseph Selden, a judge of the Supreme Court of Arkansas. When the Longs returned to England in 1828, they took with them their Virginia-born slave, Jacob Walker. As slavery was no longer legal in England, Jacob is listed as a manservant on the 1841 census. The Longs had four children together, along with two daughters from Harriet's previous marriage. Harriet died from cancer in 1841, and when Jacob Walker died two months later from smallpox, following an inoculation, he was interred in the same grave, which is now a Grade II listed memorial.

References

Attribution:

External links
 

 
 
 
Law Articles of Smith's Dictionary of Greek and Roman Antiquities

1800 births
1879 deaths
Academics of University College London
Alumni of St John's College, Cambridge
Alumni of Trinity College, Cambridge
English classical scholars
People from Poulton-le-Fylde
British slave owners
Committee members of the Society for the Diffusion of Useful Knowledge